The Navalny Headquarters was a Russian network of regional organizations founded by opposition leader Alexei Navalny as part of the 2017 presidential campaign. It lasted until April 2021, when the liquidation of the headquarters was announced in connection with the demand of the Moscow prosecutor's office to recognize the "public movement "Navalny Headquarters" as an extremist organization. It was re-established in October 2022.

At the peak of Navalny's presidential campaign, 81 headquarters operated in the regions of Russia, including 11 "people's" ones - opened on the initiative of local residents on their own. After the 2018 presidential election, headquarters continued to work in 45 main regions, their profile changed to a regional politicianу.

History

2017-2021
In December 2016, Alexei Navalny announced the start of the Navalny 2018 presidential campaign. As part of it, the creation of regional campaign headquarters across the country was announced, in which it was planned to collect signatures for the nomination of an oppositionist for president and organize campaigning for a candidate in the regions with the involvement of volunteers The first headquarters was opened in St. Petersburg on February 4, 2017. Its opening took place with the participation of Navalny himself: he held a press conference and met with volunteers, which later became a constant practice.

The opening of regional headquarters was often accompanied by problems: pressure was put on renters of premises, headquarters were vandalized, Navalny himself missed openings several times due to administrative arrests and became a victim of attacks. Already after the opening, many headquarters were subjected to attacks by pro-government activists and vandals, visits by security officials (sometimes with the seizure of campaign materials and equipment) or arrests of employees.

After the end of the election campaign and the “voters' strike”, headquarters in the least significant regions were closed, while some of them continued to work as “people's headquarters” for some time. Headquarters in 45 key regions continued to work, reformatted into regional political organizations.

In August 2019, the Investigative Committee opened a case on the laundering of 1 billion rubles by the Anti-Corruption Foundation. As part of this case, several waves of searches were carried out at the FBK office, Navalny's headquarters throughout Russia, their employees and volunteers, and the accounts of legal entities and individuals were blocked. The head of the network of headquarters, Leonid Volkov, stated that the case was initiated with the aim of defeating Navalny's political organization, and also emphasized that the Anti-Corruption Fund, against which the case was initiated, has no legal relationship to Navalny's headquarters. Despite the pressure associated with the criminal case, Navalny's headquarters did not stop working.

On April 16, 2021, the Moscow prosecutor's office filed a lawsuit to recognize Navalny's headquarters and the FBK as extremist organizations. On April 26, the prosecutor's office decided to suspend the activities of the “Navalny Headquarters public movement” (which never legally existed). On April 29, the head of the network of headquarters, Leonid Volkov, announced that the headquarters were officially dissolved in order to avoid persecution of employees and activists under articles on extremism. At the same time, it was announced that some headquarters would be reorganized into independent regional political organizations not associated with the FBK and Alexei Navalny.

On June 9, 2021, the Moscow City Court, in a closed session, recognized the "public movement "Navalny Headquarters"" and the FBK as extremist organizations and banned their activities in Russia. By this time, the headquarters had been disbanded for more than a month. On August 4, the First Appellate court upheld the decision to recognize the organizations as extremist, endowing the Moscow City Court's earlier decision with legal force.

During the process of recognizing Navalny's headquarters as an extremist organization, many of their ex-coordinators left the country due to the threat of persecution, and some of those who remained in Russia were under investigation. 15 former coordinators continued to engage in politics, announcing their nomination to the State Duma or local authorities. In connection with the “law against the FBK” adopted on June 4, 2021, none of them was allowed to participate in the elections as a candidate (or was forced to stop the campaign).

On November 9, 2021, Lilia Chanysheva, the former coordinator of Navalny’s city headquarters, was detained in Ufa and subsequently sent to a pre-trial detention center. She was accused of leading an extremist community, despite her resignation from the post of coordinator before the organization was recognized as extremist (de facto applying Ex post facto law). On December 28, searches were held at the premises of the ex-coordinators of the headquarters of Ksenia Fadeeva (Tomsk) and Zakhar Sarapulov (Irkutsk). They were charged and banned from certain activities as a preventive measure.

Since 2022

The organization was re-established in October 2022, particularly to oppose Vladimir Putin, the Russian invasion of Ukraine, and subsequent mobilization in Russia.

Activities 
Initially, Navalny's headquarters were deployed throughout Russia as part of the politician's presidential campaign to solve three main tasks: preparing for the collection of signatures, training observers and agitation. They also hosted meetings of supporters and volunteers, trainings, seminars and other events. In the summer of 2017, an active stage of street campaigning began in all cities where headquarters are present: campaign volunteers participated in "cubes" - pickets using a campaign structure in the form of a cube, which collected signatures of citizens for the nomination of Navalny as a presidential candidate in December 2017. In the future, these signatures had to be verified and included in the official signature lists in a short time. The headquarters also covered their own activities on social networks and on YouTube.

In 2017, regional headquarters organized protests announced by Navalny in their cities: March 26, 12 June and 7 October. They tried to coordinate the events with the authorities, but in some cities people took to the streets without the permission of local administrations. Headquarters provided legal and other assistance to detained protesters.

On December 24, 2017, headquarters organized initiative groups in 20 cities to nominate Alexei Navalny as a candidate in the presidential elections. On December 25, the Central Election Commission refused to register the politician as a candidate, in connection with which the Navalny team announced a "strike of voters", for which regional headquarters were reorganized. The headquarters also organized observation of the presidential elections in key regions, including Chechnya, known for large-scale electoral fraud, the persecution of disloyal citizens and human rights violations.

After the 2018 presidential election, the network of headquarters was reduced to 45 of the most successful and restructured to work on political projects, mainly on the local agenda. Some headquarters continued to work in the "people's" mode - without funding from the federal headquarters. All active headquarters participated in the organization of protests until the closure of the network in April 2021, among them:

 2018 Russian pension protests
 2019 Moscow protests
 2021 Russian protests

List of Navalny regional headquarters

See also

Russia of the Future
Smart Voting

References 

Non-profit organizations based in Russia
Alexei Navalny
Political parties disestablished in 2021
2017 establishments in Russia
Liberal parties in Russia
Political parties established in 2017
Political parties established in 2022
Banned political parties in Russia